The Pointe de la Gorgeat is a Chartreuse Mountain culminating at 1,486 m above sea level in the French department of Savoie.

Hike
Departure is possible from the Col du Granier.

References 

Mountains of the Alps
Mountains of Savoie
Chartreuse Mountains